Hube is a surname and given name. As a surname, it can also be spelled "Hübe" (German).

Notable people with the surname include:

 Hans-Valentin Hube (1890–1944), German soldier
 Jörg Hube (1943–2009), German actor and director
 Rick Hube (1947–2009), Vermont politician
 Douglas P. Hube (born 1941), Canadian astronomer
 Florian Hube (born 1980), German football player

Notable people with the given name include:

 Hube Wagner (1891–1979), American football player